KCTA (1030 AM) is a Christian talk radio station based in Corpus Christi, Texas. It is under ownership of Broadcasting Corporation of the Southwest.

KCTA operates on a clear channel frequency (not to be confused with Clear Channel the company) but is limited in its broadcasting hours.  It must protect the Class A station on the frequency, WBZ Boston, from interference.  KCTA is allowed to broadcast only during daytime hours. (The station holds an unusual "limited time" license (see FCC regulation 73.1725) which would allow operation at night during hours not used by WBZ.  Since WBZ operates 24 hours a day, 7 days a week, there is in practice no difference between KCTA's "limited time" license and a traditional "daytime only" (see FCC regulation 73.1720) license.)

History
KCTA was first authorized to operate in 1944 as KWBU on 1010 kHz. The station was co-owned by Baylor University and Carr P. Collins, which later formed the Century Broadcasting Company. The station moved to 1030 in 1945 under a series of Special Service Authorizations (SSAs); two years later, Baylor bought back the station. It attempted to move KWBU to Houston in a docket that was dismissed in 1949. As the FCC continued to grant the station SSAs to operate, KWBU was transferred to the Baptist General Convention of Texas in 1950. It would not be until 1954 that KWBU was properly licensed.

On January 1, 1957, concurrent with the sale of the station to Broadcasters, Inc., KWBU became KATR. On November 2, 1959, following a sale to Broadcasting Corporation of the Southwest, KATR became KCTA.

External links
KCTA Radio Website

CTA
CTA
Radio stations established in 1944
1944 establishments in Texas
CTA